John Derek Jones  (1927 – 9 March 2013) was an English Congregationalist missionary and politician in Botswana. A member of the Gaborone City Council, he served as the first Mayor of Gaborone from 1966 to 1968.

Biography 
Jones was born in England in 1927. He earned a master's degree at the University of Oxford, and then received his Diploma in Theology from Oxford's Mansfield College. He served in Egypt in the Royal Air Force for two years. After being ordained, he moved to the Bechuanaland Protectorate (now Botswana) in 1954 as a missionary of the London Missionary Society. He later served as the Secretary of the United Congregational Church of Southern Africa.

When Gaborone was built as the independent Botswana's new capital in the 1960s, it needed a government. Vice-President Quett Masire urged him to run for city council as a Botswana Democratic Party candidate, but Jones did not believe that would be appropriate for a clergyman. Instead, he agreed to run as an independent and was elected unopposed in the South Ring constituency. Soon after, he was chosen as the city's first mayor in 1966. In 1968, he remained on the city council but stepped down as mayor, and was succeeded by Grace Dambe. He served his full term on the city council, but chose not to run for reelection in 1969. Soon after, he was awarded an OBE.

From 1972 to 1993, he managed the Botswana Book Centre. Later, he returned to England, where he died on 9 March 2013, aged 86.

See also 
 White people in Botswana

References 

1927 births
20th-century Congregationalist ministers
21st-century Congregationalists
Alumni of Mansfield College, Oxford
Alumni of the University of Oxford
Bechuanaland Protectorate people
British emigrants to Botswana
Botswana emigrants to England
Botswana people of English descent
Botswana city councillors
Congregationalist missionaries in Africa
English Congregationalist ministers
English Congregationalist missionaries
Naturalized citizens of Botswana
People from Gaborone
Protestant missionaries in Botswana
Botswana Congregationalist ministers
2013 deaths
White Botswana people